Kennedy Jones  may refer to:
 Kennedy Jones (journalist) (1865–1921), British journalist, editor, newspaper manager, and Member of Parliament
 Kennedy Jones (musician) (1900–1990), American guitarist and music writer